Philtraea monillata is a moth in the family Geometridae. It is found in North America, where it has been recorded from the southern United States in drainage basin of the Mississippi River from Missouri and Kentucky south to Louisiana.

The wingspan is 10–16 mm. The forewings are white with broad yellow antemedial and postmedial lines, bordered by dark spots on both sides. There is an O-shaped marking along the costa and the terminal line consists of dark dots. The hindwings are white. Adults are on wing from early June to late August in two generations per year.

References

Moths described in 1971
Ourapterygini
Moths of North America